The Museum für Moderne Kunst (Museum of Modern Art), or short MMK, in Frankfurt, was founded in 1981 and opened to the public 6 June 1991. The museum was designed by the Viennese architect Hans Hollein. Because of its triangular shape, it is popularly called "piece of cake" (""). Since 2018,  has been director of the MMK.

History 
The newest of Frankfurt's museums was founded in 1981. The idea to set up a museum for modern art in Frankfurt came from Peter Iden, an influential theatre and art critic at the Frankfurter Rundschau and founding director of the museum (1978–1987). With the Mayor Walter Wallmann (CDU) and the Head of the Cultural department Hilmar Hoffmann (SPD) Iden found political advocates for his project. In 1989, the Swiss art historian and curator Jean-Christophe Ammann moved from the Kunsthalle Basel to Frankfurt am Main and opened the new Museum für Moderne Kunst (MMK) Frankfurt am Main there on 6 June 1991. With a new exhibition model, the Change of Scene, which took place a total of 20 times with the help of private sponsors (Change of Scene I, 1992 until Change of Scene XX, 2001–02), the new museum gained international renown. At the change of scene exhibitions, the inventory of the museum was rearranged every six months and enriched with new additions, loans and special exhibitions.

In 1983, Hollein won the competition for the Museum für Moderne Kunst; three years earlier, his proposal for the city's Museum für angewandte Kunst had finished a close second behind Richard Meier's prize-winning design. The ground-breaking was delayed until 1987, and the new museum was eventually built at a cost of about $38 million. It opened in 1991.

The MMK Zollamt is a satellite exhibition site that belongs since 1999 to the MMK and is located in a building directly opposite the museum that once was home to the City of Frankfurt's Main Customs Office. The building has been completely modernised and artistic positions by younger artists or "unknowns" have been presented here regularly since 2007 with the support of Jürgen Ponto-Stiftung.

Architecture 
Hollein molded a building to the three-sided space, so that the large rooms at the narrow end are wedge-shaped, producing  of exhibition space. The height of the three-storey building is adapted to the surroundings and is characterised by the "triangular shape" and facade design. The building houses three main levels for exhibitions and an administration area on the mezzanine, which is located above the entrance area and the cafeteria. The MMK library and archive are also located in this area. The entire area of the museum has a basement. There are workshops, depots and a lecture hall.

Collection 
The core of the museum is the legacy of German collector Karl Ströher with 87 works of Pop art and Minimalism. The manufacturer Ströher had originally bequeathed to his native city of Darmstadt on condition that a museum be built to house them. When funds for the project were not approved, Ströher's heirs sold the choice ensemble to Frankfurt and donated the painting "Yellow and Green Brushstrokes" by Roy Lichtenstein to the museum as a gift. Major artists since the 1950s from the Ströher Collection displayed, including Jasper Johns, Robert Rauschenberg, Carl Andre, John Chamberlain, Dan Flavin, Donald Judd, Roy Lichtenstein, Walter de Maria, Robert Morris, Claes Oldenburg, James Rosenquist, Frank Stella, Cy Twombly, Andy Warhol, Tom Wesselman and George Segal, with his Jazz Combo. Between 1981 and 1987, the museum's co-founder Peter Iden expanded the collection by adding works from the seventies and eighties. Later parts of the collection have been amassed by the museum's first director, Jean-Christophe Ammann. In 2006 the Museum für Moderne Kunst, along with the Kunstmuseum Liechtenstein and the Kunstmuseum St. Gallen, acquired the private collection of Cologne art dealer Rolf Ricke, comprising works by Richard Artschwager, Bill Bollinger, Donald Judd, Gary Kuehn, und Steven Parrino. Today, the permanent collection includes over 4,500 works of international art, ranging from the 1960s to the present.

Locations
 Museum, Domstraße 10 (MUSEUM ᴹᴹᴷ FÜR MODERNE KUNST)
 Taunusturm, Taunustor 1 (TOWERᴹᴹᴷ)
 Zollamt, Domstraße 3 (ZOLLAMTᴹᴹᴷ)

Exhibitions 

 1985: Bilder für Frankfurt. Sammlung Museum für Moderne Kunst im Deutschen Architekturmuseum, Frankfurt
 1987: Dalla Pop Art Americana alla nuova figurazione. Museum für Moderne Kunst / Padiglione d'arte contemporanea, Milano
 1991: Opening Exhibition Museum für Moderne Kunst Frankfurt, 6 June 1991
 1991: Carl Andre: Extraneous Roots
 1994: Das Museum für Moderne Kunst und die Sammlung Ströher
 1997: Views from Abroad: European Perspectives on American Art
 1997: Thomas Bayrle: TassenTassen 1967–1997
 1997: Alex Katz: Smiles
 1998: Alighiero Boetti: Die Welt zur Welt bringen / Mettere al Mondo il Mondo
 1999: Bill Viola: A 25 Year Survey Exhibition – Werke aus 25 Jahren
 1999: Dan Flavin: Two Primary Series and one Secondary, Projektraum MMK im Alten Hauptzollamt
 2000: Eric Fischl: Works from the 1980s & Travel of Romance
 2000: Screenings 01 – 10: Filme, Videos und Videoinstallationen, Projektraum MMK im Alten Hauptzollamt
 2001: Lucian Freud: Naked Portraits
 2001: Jeff Wall: Figures and Places
 2002: Hans Peter Feldmann: Kinderzimmer
 2002: Das Museum, die Sammlung, der Direktor und seine Liebschaften
 2002: Martin Boyce: Dornbracht Installation Projects
 2003: Das lebendige Museum
 2003: Rosemarie Trockel: Das Kinderzimmer
 2004: Teresa Margolles: Muerte sin fin
 2004: Elaine Sturtevant: The Brutal Truth
 2005: Whats New, Pussycat?
 2005: Spinnwebzeit: Die ebay-Vernetzung
 2006: Barbara Klemm: 14 Tage China im Jahre 1985
 2006: Thomas Bayrle: 40 Years Chinese Rock'n'Roll
 2006: Thomas Demand: Klause
 2006: Humanism in China. Ein fotografisches Porträt
 2006: Serge Spitzer und Ai Weiwei: Territorial
 2006: Andreas Slominski: Roter Sand und ein gefundenes Glück
 2007: Maurizio Cattelan
 2007: Das Kapital. Blue Chips & Masterpieces
 2007: Verwendungsnachweis. Stipendiaten der Jürgen Ponto-Stiftung 2003 – 2006
 2007: Taryn Simon: An American Index of the Hidden and Unfamiliar
 2007: Frank Moritz: Menschenbild II
 2008: Hans Josephsohn: Bildhauer
 2008: Miroslav Tichý: Fotograf
 2008: Bernard Buffet: Maler
 2008: © Takashi Murakami
 2009: Bogomir Ecker, Mark Wallinger und ein Unbekannter Meister: Angel Dust
 2009: Yellow and Green. Positionen aus der Sammlung des MMK
 2009: Double Reiner Ruthenbeck: Umgekippte Möbel, 1971
 2009: Sarah Morris: Gemini Dressage
 2009: Gerhard Richter: 2 Seestücke, 1975
 2009: Jack Goldstein
 2009: Double Sol LeWitt: Wall Drawing #261, 1975
 2009: Peter Roehr: Werke aus Frankfurter Sammlungen
 2009: Double Isa Genzken: 3 Vollellipsoide Skulpturen, 1978
 2010: Radical Conceptual. Positionen aus der Sammlung des MMK
 2010: Funktionen der Zeichnung. Konzeptuelle Kunst auf Papier aus der Sammlung des MMK
 2010: Double Wolfgang Laib: Blütenstaub von Haselnuß
 2010: Florian Hecker: Event, Stream, Objekt
 2010: Double Andreas Slominski: Fallen – Hochsprunganlage – Berg Sportgeräte, 1988
 2010: Double Anri Sala: "Title Suspended", 2008
 2010: Not in Fashion. Mode und Fotografie der 90er Jahre
 2010: The Lucid Evidence. Fotografie aus der Sammlung des MMK
 2011: New Frankfurt Internationals: Stories and Stages
 2011: Félix González-Torres: Specific Objects without Specific Form
 2011: MMK 1991–2011. 20 Jahre Gegenwart im MMK, MMK Zollamt und MainTor-Areal
 2011: Douglas Gordon
 2012: Andy Warhol: Headlines
 2012: MAKING HISTORY. Im Rahmen von RAY – Fotografieprojekte Frankfurt Rhein/Main
 2012: Fotografie Total. Werke aus der Sammlung des MMK
 2012: Thomas Scheibitz: One-Time Pad
 2012: Alex Monteith: Exercise Blackbird
 2013: Carsten Nicolai: Unidisplay. Uni(psycho)acoustic
 2013: Rineke Dijkstra: The Krazy House
 2013: Danica Dakić: Safe Frame
 2013: Franz West: Wo ist mein Achter?
 2013/2014: Hélio Oiticica: Das große Labyrinth
 2014: Die Göttliche Komödie: Himmel, Hölle, Fegefeuer aus Sicht afrikanischer Gegenwartskünstler
 2014/2015: Subodh Gupta: Everything is Inside
 2014/2015: Sturtevant. Drawing Double Reversal
 2015: Gerald Domenig: Ausstellungsvorbereitung
 2015: Isa Genzken: New Works
 2015: Imagine Reality. RAY 2015 Fotografieprojekte Frankfurt RheinMain
 2015: William Forsythe: The Fact of Matter
 2016: Kader Attia: Sacrifice and Harmony
 2016–17: Mathieu Kleyebe Abonnenc: Mefloquine Dreams
 2016–17: Fiona Tan: Geografie der Zeit
 2016–17: 25 Jahre MMK Museum für Moderne Kunst – Neue Sammlungspräsentation
 2017: Ed Atkins: Corpsing
 2017: Claudia Andujar: Morgen darf nicht gestern sein
 2017: Carolee Schneemann: Kinetische Malerei
 2017–18: A Tale of Two Worlds. Experimentelle Kunst Lateinamerikas der 1940er- bis 80er-Jahre im Dialog mit der Sammlung des MMK
 2018–19: Cady Noland
 2019: Marianna Simnett
 2019–20: Museum

The museum and its director, Susanne Gaensheimer, were commissioned to curate the German Pavilion at the Venice Biennale in 2011 and 2013.

Gallery

Museumsufer 
MMK is part of the Museumsufer.

See also 
 Museumsufer

Literature 

Iden, Peter; Lauter, Rolf : Bilder für Frankfurt: Bestandskatalog des Museums für Moderne Kunst, München, Prestel 1985, ;  

Publikationsliste des MMK, July 2004 edition (PDF-Version, 60 KB)
 Kiefer, Theresia: Architektur und Konzeption eines zeitgenössischen Museums am Beispiels des Museums für moderne Kunst in Frankfurt am Main. 1995
 Bee, Andreas: Zusammengedrängt zwischen zwei Buchdeckeln. In: Zehn Jahre Museum für Moderne Kunst Frankfurt am Main. Köln 2003
Hollein, Hans: Ausstellen, Aufstellen, Abstellen Überlegungen zur Aufgabe des Museums für Moderne Kunst. In: Museum für Moderne Kunst. Schriftreihe des Hochbauamtes zu Bauaufgaben der Stadt Frankfurt am Main. Der Magistrat der Stadt Frankfurt am Main. Frankfurt 1991. .
Ammann, Jean-Christophe; Christmut Präger: Museum für Moderne Kunst und Sammlung Ströher. Frankfurt 1992
Lauter, Rolf (ed.): Das Museum für Moderne Kunst und die Sammlung Ströher. Zur Geschichte einer Privatsammlung, Ausstellungskatalog (5. Dezember 1994 bis 8. Januar 1995), Frankfurt am Main, 1994. .

Hans Hollein, Gestaltungsprinzipien der Museumsarchitektur. In: Iden, Peter; Lauter, Rolf (Ed.), Bilder für Frankfurt, Bestandskatalog des Musems für Moderne Kunst Frankfurt. München 1985.  
 Schoeler, Andreas von: Museum für Moderne Kunst Frankfurt am Main. Ernst & Sohn, 1991

References

External links

 
 

Art museums and galleries in Germany
Modern art museums in Germany
Museums in Frankfurt
Art museums established in 1981
Museum Fur Moderne Kunst